The Alvarado wrestling family, also referred to as La Dinastia Alvarado ("The Alvarado Dynasty") in Spanish, is a Mexico City based family of professional wrestlers. The family works primarily in Mexico but have made appearances in the United States of America, Canada, Europe, and Japan over the years. The Patriarch of the family was Juan Alvarado Ibarra, who wrestled under the ring name Shadito Cruz, followed by his six sons who all used ring name variations of "Brazo"  and included wrestlers Brazo de Oro (Spanish for Golden Arm), El Brazo (The Arm), Brazo de Plata (Silver Arm), Brazo Cibernético (Cybernetic Arm), Brazo de Platino (Platinum Arm) and Super Brazo (Super Arm). A third-generation of Alvardos made their debut around the turn of the millennium, originally all working under "Brazo" related ring names but later most changed their names to create an identity for themselves. Due to the traditions and secrecy of Lucha Libre some wrestlers who use the "Brazo" ring name are not blood relatives of the Alvarado family and others is unconfirmed if they are truly part of the Alvarado family or not. Due to the number of wrestlers using ring names with the word "Brazo" in it the Alvarado family is at times also referred to as "the Brazo Family", while Los Brazo refers specifically to the trio of Brazo de Oro, Brazo de Plata and El Brazo.

All family members who currently are or previously have been wrestling under a "Brazo" name have begun their careers as enmascarados, or masked wrestlers. All their masks had or have the same basic mask design with the depiction of a person doing a double bicep flex pose. All six sons of Shadito Cruz have lost their masks as results of losing Luchas de Apuestas or "bet matches", while none of the third-generation Brazos (except La Máscara and Goya Kong) lost their masks in the same manner. Most of the third-generation Alvarado children began their careers using Brazo names but were later either encouraged or forced to change their names to create an identity of their own instead.

Three generations

First generation
Juan Alvarado Ibarra (January 7, 1915 – February 3, 2003) – Wrestled under the ring name Shadito Cruz.

Second generation
Jesús Alvarado Nieves (October 7, 1959 – April 28, 2017) – Wrestled under the ring name "Brazo de Oro".
Juan Alvarado Nieves (July 30, 1961 – October 15, 2013) – Wrestles under the ring name "El Brazo", also known as "Brazo Negro", "Brazo Hermoso", "La Braza" and a number of other ring names.
José Luis Alvarado Nieves (March 19, 1963 – July 26, 2021) – Wrestles under the ring name "Brazo de Plata", also known as "Super Porky".
José Aarón Alvarado Nieves (May 9, 1966 – October 27, 1999) – Wrestled under the ring name Brazo Cibernético, also known as Brazo del Futur, Brazo de Bronce, Robin Hood and a number of other ring names.
Daniel Alvarado Nieves (March 3, 1973) – Wrestles under the ring name Brazo de Platino, also worked as Shadito Cruz, Jr.
Martín Antonio Alvarado Nieves (March 7, 1968) – Wrestles under the ring name Super Brazo

Third generation
Jose Cristian Alvarado Ruiz (November 8, 1980) – Wrestles under the ring name Máximo, originally wrestled as El Brazo, Jr. but is the son of José Alvarado, not Juan Alvarado.
La Máscara (January 8, 1982) – Originally wrestled as Brazo de Oro, Jr. Son of Jesús Alvarado Nieves. Real name not revealed.
Psycho Clown (December 16, 1985) – Originally wrestled as Brazo de Plata, Jr. Son of José Alvarado, real name not revealed.
Gloria Alvarado Nava (May 4, 1987) – Wrestles under the ring name Goya Kong. Daughter of José Alvarado.
Nicole Alvarado Nava (October 3, 1988) – Wrestles under the ring name Muñeca de Plata. Daughter of José Alvarado.
Robin (November 9) – Wrestles under the ring name Robin, after his father, José Aarón Alvarado's ring name Robin Hood. Real name not revealed.
Andros de Plata  (date of birth not known) – Son of José Alvarado, was the second son to use the ring name Brazo de Plata, Jr. before changing his ring name.
Super Brazo, Jr. (date of birth not known) – Son of Martín Antonio Alvarado. Real name not revealed.
El Brazo, Jr. (date of birth not known) – Son of Juan Alvarado Nieves. Real name not revealed
Brazo Celestial (date of birth not known) – Third generation Alvarado, not verified who he is the son of.

Related through marriage
Sandra González Calderón – Ex-wife of Jesús Alvarado, not the mother of La Máscara, wrestles as Lady Apache.
La Alimaña – Married to one of the second-generation Alvarado sisters.
India Sioux – Married to Jose Cristian Alvarado. The couple have at least one son.

Fictional or unconfirmed family members
A number of wrestlers have been presented as part of the Alvarado family by using the "Brazo" ring name, but later revealed to be fictional and some, where the family relationship has not been confirmed
Brazo Cibernético, Jr. – Claims to be a son of José Aarón Alvarado, unconfirmed
Brazo de Platino, Jr. – Claims to be third-generation Alvarado. Uses the same ring name Jose Cristian Alvarado used early in his career
Super Brazo II
Golden Magic – Originally wrestled as Brazo Metalico.

Family tree
† = deceased

Homenaje a Shadito Cruz
In early 2013 it was announced that the Alvarado family, in corporation with the National Chamber of Women in Mexico (Canadem) and Producciones Vanguardistas, would hold a show that would feature no less than 19 wrestlers from the Alvarado family and serve as a fundraiser for Canadem and pay homage to the Alvardo patriarch Shadito Cruz and matriarch Ana Nieves. The Director of Sports Activities and Social Development, Lorena Cid and promoter Ismael Gonzalez Arellano cited the Alvarado family as an example of how families should stay together despite adversity. The show took place on Sunday, February 17, 2013, in Arena Neza, in Naucalpan, State of Mexico. In the main event of the show the team of Máximo and La Máscara defeated Los Capos, Jr. (Cien Caras, Jr. and Hijo del Máscara Año 2000) to win the 'Copa Shadito Cruz trophy. During the show it was confirmed that Brazo Celestial was indeed a member of the Alvarado Family, and not just someone who had been allowed to use the name. Neither El Brazo nor Psycho Clown actually wrestled on the show since they were under contract with AAA they were not allowed to compete on a show involving CMLL wrestlers. El Brazo made an appearance before the second match along with his brothers Brazo de Oro and Brazo de Plata, celebrating the original Los Brazos. Psycho Clown made an appearance during the main event to help his cousins win the match. For the show Gran Markus, Jr. came out of retirement to compete in the second match, he wrestled wearing the mask the officially lost on 2002 for this one-time appearance.

References

 
Mexican professional wrestlers
Professional wrestling families